Ashley Alberts (born 4 February 1984) is an Australian former rugby league footballer who played for the North Queensland Cowboys and Manly Warringah Sea Eagles in the National Rugby League.

Playing career
Born in Mackay, Queensland, Alberts played his junior rugby league for Norths Mackay, North Mackay High School and Norths Rockhampton before being signed by the North Queensland Cowboys. In 2001, while attending Kirwan State High School, Alberts represented the Australian Schoolboys and Queensland under-17 sides.

In Round 4 of the 2002 NRL season, Alberts made his NRL debut as an 18-year old in the Cowboys' 20–50 loss to the New Zealand Warriors, starting on the wing. He scored his first NRL try in the Cowboys' 20–32 loss to the Canberra Raiders in Round 11. After playing five games for the Cowboys, Alberts signed with the Brisbane Broncos for the 2003 season but was released in December 2002 before even attending a training session.

In 2003, he joined the Central Queensland Comets in the Queensland Cup and represented Queensland under-19 that season. In 2004, Alberts joined the Toowoomba Clydesdales, who were a feeder club for the Brisbane Broncos.

In 2005, Alberts joined the Manly-Warringah Sea Eagles on a two-year deal. He played eight games for the side in 2005 before being granted a release in early 2006, returning to play for the Central Comets in the Queensland Cup.

Statistics

NRL
 Statistics are correct to the end of the 2005 season

References

1984 births
Living people
Australian rugby league players
Central Queensland Capras players
Manly Warringah Sea Eagles players
North Queensland Cowboys players
Rugby league centres
Rugby league players from Mackay, Queensland
Rugby league wingers
Toowoomba Clydesdales players